Edward Wilbur Ainsmith (born as Edward Anshmedt; February 4, 1890 – September 6, 1981), nicknamed "Dorf," was a catcher in Major League Baseball (MLB). He played fifteen seasons with the Washington Senators (1910–1918), Detroit Tigers (1919–1921), St. Louis Cardinals (1921–1923), Brooklyn Robins (1923), and New York Giants (1924). He batted and threw right-handed. In 1,078 career games, Ainsmith batted .232 with 707 hits and 317 runs batted in.

After retiring as a player, Ainsmith worked as a minor league umpire, a baseball scout, and a manager in the All-American Girls Professional Baseball League.

Early life
Ainsmith was born in Moscow. His family came to the United States through Ellis Island when he was young. He attended Colby Academy in New Hampshire. He began his playing career in the New England League in 1908 before joining the Senators in the American League.

Career
The Day Book in Chicago, Illinois described Ainsmith in their May 10, 1913 edition as "a gingery young receiver, throws well, can handle Walter Johnson and is a good batter. But he is not the man to handle a young pitcher like [Joe] Engle". The Washington Times wrote in 1922 that Ainsmith "is a formidable blocker at the plate. He is endowed with tremendous strength like an ancient Greek athlete or a Roman gladiator. It is almost impossible to upset him when he sets himself on the base path."

Ainsmith was known for his toughness on the field. Walter Johnson said that if Aimsmith was bleeding from being spiked by an opposing player, Ainsmith would refuse assistance from the team trainer, denying that he was injured. In 1913, as a member of the Washington Senators, Ainsmith was suspended by Ban Johnson for throwing dirt at umpire Peter McLaughlin.

On April 21, 1915, Ainsmith was sentenced to 30 days at Occoquan Workhouse for an assault on a streetcar operator in Washington, D.C.

In 1918, Ainsmith was drafted into the United States armed forces. He appealed to the United States Department of War for an exemption from the draft, but Secretary of War Newton D. Baker ruled that baseball was not an exempt occupation.

Later life
Ainsmith also worked as a scout in the New York Giants organization. In the early 1940s, he provided a scouting report on pitcher Sal Maglie that, though lukewarm, led to Maglie being drafted by the Giants. Ainsmith managed the 1947 Rockford Peaches in the All-American Girls Professional Baseball League.

References

External links

Eddie Ainsmith at RetroSheet.org

1890 births
1981 deaths
Major League Baseball catchers
Washington Senators (1901–1960) players
Detroit Tigers players
St. Louis Cardinals players
Brooklyn Robins players
New York Giants (NL) players
Washington Senators (1901–1960) coaches
Major League Baseball players from Russia
Lawrence Colts players
Lowell Tigers players
Jersey City Skeeters players
Minneapolis Millers (baseball) players
Indianapolis Indians players
Little Rock Travelers players
Portland Beavers players
Seattle Indians players
Toronto Maple Leafs (International League) players
All-American Girls Professional Baseball League managers
Emigrants from the Russian Empire to the United States
Russian baseball players